Lars Nieberg (born 24 July 1963 in Wittingen, Lower Saxony) is a German equestrian.  He participated in the 1996 and 2000 Olympics in show jumping competition.

Olympic record
Nigberg participated at the 1996 Summer Olympics in Atlanta, where he won a gold medal in Team Jumping, together with Franke Sloothaak, Ulrich Kirchhoff and Ludger Beerbaum.

Nieberg again won a gold medal in Team Jumping at the 2000 Summer Olympics in Sydney, together with Marcus Ehning, Otto Becker and Ludger Beerbaum.

References

1963 births
Living people
People from Wittingen
Olympic gold medalists for Germany
Equestrians at the 1996 Summer Olympics
Equestrians at the 2000 Summer Olympics
Olympic equestrians of Germany
German male equestrians
Olympic medalists in equestrian
Medalists at the 2000 Summer Olympics
Medalists at the 1996 Summer Olympics
Sportspeople from Lower Saxony